Securinine is an alkaloid found in Securinega suffruticosa and Phyllanthus niruri.

Pharmacology 
Securinine has pro-convulsant effects and it has a strong spastic effect, similar to the actions of strychnine.

Securinine is a GABA-A antagonist.

See also 
 Norsecurinine
 Phenazine

References 

Tetracyclic compounds
Nitrogen heterocycles
Lactones
Alkaloids
Furanones
Cyclohexenes
Withdrawn drugs